Mediterranean Historical Review is a peer-reviewed academic journal established in 1986, covering the ancient, medieval, early modern, and contemporary history of the Mediterranean basin. It is published by Routledge on behalf of the School of History at Tel Aviv University. The editors-in-chief are Benjamin Arbel and Irad Malkin

References

External links 
 

History of the Mediterranean
Publications established in 1986
Biannual journals
Taylor & Francis academic journals
English-language journals
History journals